The Koch dynasty (Pron: kɒʧ; 1515–1949) ruled parts of eastern Indian subcontinent in present-day Assam and Bengal. Biswa Singha established power in the erstwhile Kamata Kingdom which had emerged from the decaying Kamarupa Kingdom.  The dynasty came to power by removing the Baro-Bhuyans, who had earlier removed the short-lived rule established by Alauddin Hussain Shah.

The dynasty split into three among the descendants of Biswa Singha's three sons; two antagonistic branches Koch Bihar and Koch Hajo and a third branch at Khaspur. Koch Bihar aligned with the Mughals and the Koch Hajo branch broke up into various sub-branches under the Ahom kingdom.  Koch Bihar became a princely state during British rule and was absorbed after Indian independence.  The third branch at Khaspur disappeared into the Kachari kingdom. Raikat is a collateral branch of the Koch dynasty that claim descent from the Sisya Singha, the brother of Biswa Singha.

Etymology
The name Koch denotes a matrilineal ethnic group to which Biswa Singha's mother belonged; and the king as well as most of the population of the kingdom (Koch Bihar) belonged to the Koch community.

History

Historical background

After the fall of the Pala dynasty of Kamarupa, the kingdom fractured into different domains in the 12th century. Sandhya, a ruler of Kamarupanagara (present-day North Guwahati) moved his capital further west to present-day North Bengal in the middle of the 13th century and the domain he ruled over came to be called Kamata kingdom.  The buffer region, between the eastern kingdoms and Kamata was the domain of the Baro-Bhuyans chieftains.  Alauddin Husain Shah of Gaur removed Nilambar of the Khen dynasty in 1498, occupied Kamata  and placed his son Danyal Husayn in charge. Within a few years the Baro-Bhuyans—led by one Harup Narayan of the Brahmaputra valley—defeated, captured, and executed Daniyal, and the region lapsed into Bhuyan confederate rule.

Emergence of the Koch power
It was in this context that a number of independent Koch tribes were united under a leader named Hajo,  who occupied  Rangpur and Kamrup. The Koches, spreading towards the southern plains, were able to ally with other tribal groups. Among various factors, the shift from slash-and-burn cultivation to settled cultivation and the breakdown of tribal clan-based relations are given as factors that contributed to the growth of Koch power.

As part of these alliances Hajo's daughter Hira married Hariya Mandal, a member of the Mech tribe from Chiknagram in present-day Kokrajhar district, though these ethnic identities are difficult to discern since there were frequent intermarriages. Bisu, born to Hariya and Hira, acquired the political legacy of his grandfather Hajo and established himself as the chief of the eastern branch of the Koches in the Khuntaghat region (present-day Kokrajhar district of Assam). It is thought that Bisu fought under the leadership of the Bhuyans as a landlord against the occupation of Kamata kingdom by Alauddin Husain Shah and thus learned their military tactics.

Consolidation of power under Bisu
He sought the alliance of tribal chiefs, against the more powerful Baro-Bhuyans and began his campaign around 1509.  Successively, he defeated the Bhuyans of Ouguri, Jhargaon, Karnapur, Phulaguri, Bijni and Pandunath (Pandu, in Guwahati).  He was particularly stretched by the Bhuyan of Karnapur, and could defeat him only by a stratagem during Bihu.  
 
In some records Bisu moved his capital from Chikana to Hingulabas (near present-day Samuktala) and then finally to Kamatapur (now called Gosanimari) which is just a few miles southeast of the present-day Cooch Behar town—but since these movements were recorded much after the events the dates and rulers associated with these movements are not expected to be accurate and these movements represent the gradual movement of Koch power towards the southern plains of the Brahmaputra valley. After subjugating the petty rulers, he announced himself the king of Kamata bounded on the east by Barnadi river and on the west by the Karatoya river in the year 1515.   

The Koch dynasty in Kamata was one of several tribal formations that developed into statehoods around 15th century in northeast India—Ahom, Chutia, Dimasa, Tripura, Manipur, etc.

Sanskritisation
At his coronation Bisu adopted Hinduism and the name Biswa Singha. Nevertheless, he retained the Koch identity of his mother discarding the ethnic identity of his father. Later, Brahman pundits created a legend that lord Siva was the father of Biswa Singha to give legitimacy to his rule and  conferred on him the status of the Kshatriya varna. According to the legend constructed at the time of coronation, Bisu was son of Siva and his tribe either the Koch or Mech people were Kshatriyas who ran away from the fear of extermination by the Brahman sage Parashurama and took shelter in Western Assam and Northern Bengal and later disguised themselves as Mlechchas. 

This process of hinduisation was much slower in the lower strata of the society, the king Biswa Singha with his tribal origin claimed Rajbanshi kshatriya status, the lower class Koch took this name after the 18th century.

Zenith
Biswa Singha's two sons, Naranarayan and Shukladhwaj (Chilarai), the king and the commander-in-chief of the army respectively, took the kingdom to its zenith. During the reign of Nara Narayan in the mid 16th-century, Koch Behar saw the propagation of eksarana-namadharma by Sankardev along with his two disciples Madhavdeva and Damodardev, which helped brought a cultural renaissance to the kingdom.The spread of this new religious movement was initially resisted by the Koch, Mech and Kachari people residing in the Koch-Kamata kingdom, for which Nara Narayan made an official order to recognise the different religious practices of the people residing in the kingdom.    

Later, Nara Narayan made Raghudev, the son of Chilarai, the governor of Koch Hajo, the eastern portion of the country. After the death of Nara Narayan, Raghudev declared independence. The division of the Kamata kingdom into Koch Bihar and Koch Hajo was permanent.   

From the early 17th century the Kingdom of Bhutan came to control the plains as far as the Gohain Kamal Ali road, with it controlling the Duars of Koch Hajo and Koch Behar till the Duar Wars in 1865 when the British East India company removed the Bhutanese influence under the  Treaty of Sinchula and these areas were later added to Goalpara district, Kamrup district, Darrang district of Assam and to Jalpaiguri district of Bengal respectively.   

By the end of the 18th century, with the increasing Vaishnavite influence, the masses of the Koch population had absorbed considerable Hindu content.

Branches

Rulers of undivided Koch kingdom 
Biswa Singha (1515-1540)
Nara Narayan (1540-1586)

Rulers of Koch Bihar 

 Lakshmi Narayan
 Bir Narayan
 Pran Narayan
 Basudev Narayan
 Mahindra Narayan
 Roop Narayan
 Upendra Narayan
 Devendra Narayan
 Dhairjendra Narayan
 Rajendra Narayan
 Dharendra Narayan
 Harendra Narayan
 Shivendra Narayan
 Narendra Narayan
 Nripendra Narayan
 Rajendra Narayan II
 Jitendra Narayan (father of Gayatri Devi)
 Jagaddipendra Narayan (brother of Gayatri Devi)
 Virajdendra Narayan

Rulers of Koch Hajo 

 Raghudev (son of Chilarai, nephew of Nara Narayan)
 Parikshit Narayan

Rulers of Darrang 
The Mughal Subah, in alliance with Lakshmi Narayan of Koch Bihar, attacked Parikshit Narayan of Koch Hajo in 1612.  Koch Hajo, bounded by Sankosh River in the west and Barnadi river in the east, was occupied by the end of that year.  Parikshit Narayan was sent to Delhi for an audience with the Mughal Emperor, but his brother Balinarayan escaped and took refuge in the Ahom kingdom.  The region to the east of Barnadi and up to the Bharali river was under the control of some Baro-Bhuyan chieftains, but they were soon removed by the Mughals.  In 1615 the Mughals, under Syed Hakim and Syed Aba Bakr, attacked the Ahoms but were repelled back to the Barnadi river.  The Ahom king, Prataap Singha, then established Balinarayan as a vassal in the newly acquired region between Barnadi and Bharali rivers, and called it Darrang.  Balinarayan's descendants continued to rule the region as a tributary to the Ahom kingdom till it was annexed by the British in 1826.

 Balinarayan (brother of Parikshit Narayan)
 Mahendra Narayan
 Chandra Narayan
 Surya Narayan

Rulers of Beltola 

Gaj Narayan Dev (brother of Parikshit Narayan, ruler of Koch Hajo, brother of Balinarayan, first Koch ruler of Darrang).
Shivendra Narayan Dev (Son of Gaj Narayan)
Gandharva Narayan Dev (Son of Shivendra Narayan)
Uttam Narayan Dev (Son of Gandharva Narayan Dev)
Dhwaja Narayan Dev (Son of Uttam Narayan Dev)
Jay Narayan Dev (Son of Dhwaja Narayan Dev)
Lambodar Narayan Dev (Son of Jay Narayan Dev)
Lokpal Narayan Dev (Son of Lambodar Narayan Dev)
Amrit Narayan Dev (Son of Lokpal Narayan Dev)
Chandra Narayan Dev (Son of Lokpal Narayan Dev) (died 1910 CE)
Rajendra Narayan Dev (Son of Chandra Narayan Dev) (died 1937 CE)
Lakshmipriya Devi (wife of Rajendra Narayan Dev) (reign:1937-1947 CE died: 1991 CE)

Rulers of Bijni 

The Bijni rulers reigned between the Sankosh and the Manas rivers, the region immediately to the east of Koch Bihar.
 Chandra Narayan (son of Parikshit Narayan)
 Joy Narayan
 Shiv Narayan
 Bijoy Narayan
 Mukunda Narayan
 Haridev Narayan
 Balit Narayan
 Indra Narayan
 Amrit Narayan
 Kumud Narayan
 Jogendra Narayan
 Bhairabendra Narayan

Rulers of Khaspur 
The Barak valley was obtained by Chilarai in 1562 from the Twipra kingdom during his expedition when he subjugated most of the major rulers in Northeast India and established the Khaspur state with a garrison at Brahmapur, that eventually came to be called Khaspur (Brahmapur→Kochpur→Khaspur).  The Koch rule began with the appointment of Kamal Narayan (step-brother of Chilarai and Naranarayan) as the Dewan a couple of years after the establishment of the garrison.  Kamalnarayan established eighteen clans of Koch families that took hereditary roles in the state of Khaspur and who came to be known as Dheyans (after Dewan).  The independent rule of the Khaspur rulers ended in 1745 when it merged with the Kachari kingdom.
  
The rulers of the Koch kingdom at Khaspur were:
 Kamal Narayan (Gohain Kamal, son of Biswa Singha, governor of Khaspur)
 Udita Narayan (declared independence of Khaspur in 1590)
 Vijay Narayana
 Dhir Narayana
 Mahendra Narayana
 Ranjit 
 Nara Singha
 Bhim Singha (his only issue, daughter Kanchani, married a prince of Kachari kingdom, and Khaspur merged with the Kachari kingdom.)

See also
Koch (caste)
Rajbongshi people

Gallery

Notes

References 

 

 

 
 

 

 
 

 

 

Kingdoms of Assam
History of Cooch Behar
States and territories established in 1515
Dynasties of India
1515 establishments in Asia